Getik is a river in Armenia, a right tributary of the Aghstafa (Aghstev). It begins on the eastern slope of the Sevan ridge near the apex Kashatakh. Average incline of approximately 31.9 m/km. Nourishment is predominantly snow-rain.

Waters are used for the irrigation.

On the banks in the upper flow of river is located Chambarak city, and in the lower flow on by its right to coast - Dilijan preserve.

Rivers of Armenia